The men's horizontal bar competition at the 1936 Summer Olympics was held at the Waldbühne on 10 and 11 August. It was the sixth appearance of the event. There were 110 competitors from 14 nations, with each nation sending a team of up to 8 men. The event was won by Aleksanteri Saarvala of Finland, the nation's first victory in the event. Germany took silver and bronze, as Konrad Frey finished second and Alfred Schwarzmann finished third.

Background

This was the sixth appearance of the event, which is one of the five apparatus events held every time there were apparatus events at the Summer Olympics (no apparatus events were held in 1900, 1908, 1912, or 1920). Seven of the 12 gymnasts from 1932 returned: silver medalist Heikki Savolainen, bronze medalist Einari Teräsvirta, and fourth-place finisher Ilmari Pakarinen of Finland, fourth-place finisher István Pelle and seventh-place finisher Miklós Péter of Hungary, tenth-place finisher Al Jochim of the United States, and eleventh-place finisher Savino Guglielmetti of Italy. Savolainen, Pelle, Péter, and Jochim had competed in 1928 as well. The 1928 gold medalist, Georges Miez of Switzerland, was also back in Berlin. Miez had finished second in the 1934 world championship to Ernst Winter of Germany, also competing in front of his home nation.

Austria, Bulgaria, and Romania each made their debut in the men's horizontal bar. The United States made its fifth appearance, most of any nation, having missed only the inaugural 1896 Games.

Competition format

The gymnastics format returned to the aggregation format used in 1928 but not in 1932. Each nation entered a team of eight gymnasts (Bulgaria had only 7). All entrants in the gymnastics competitions (Neri of Italy did not compete in the horizontal bar) performed both a compulsory exercise and a voluntary exercise, with the scores summed to give a final total. The scores in the horizontal bar were added to the other apparatus scores to give individual all-around scores; the top six individual scores on each team were summed to give a team all-around score. No separate finals were contested.

The compulsory exercise was described in the Official Report:

Schedule

Results

References

Men's horizontal bar
1936
Men's 1936
Men's events at the 1936 Summer Olympics